The BMW X4 is a compact luxury crossover SUV manufactured by BMW since 2014. It is marketed as a sports activity coupé (SAC), the second model from BMW marketed as such after the X6, and features styling elements and the roofline of a traditional two-door coupé. The X4 is widely considered as a "coupé" version of the X3, trading its practicality with a sloping rear roof which offers a sportier styling.



First generation (F26; 2014) 
The first-generation X4 was unveiled at the 2014 New York International Auto Show, followed by the 13th Beijing International Automotive Exhibition 2014, and at the 22nd Auto Mobil International Leipzig 2014. Early models included xDrive20i, xDrive28i, xDrive35i, xDrive20d, xDrive30d, and xDrive35d. 

The M Performance M40i model was announced in 2015. It has a 0– time of 4.7 seconds. It went on sale from February 2016.

Development and launch 
The F26 X4 is previewed by the BMW Concept X4 that was unveiled at Auto Shanghai 2013. The production model was later unveiled in 2014 at the New York International Auto Show. The X4 shares its powertrains with the X3, including a variety of four and six-cylinder petrol and diesel engines. The X4 is slotted above the X3 but below the X5 in the model range, and is  longer and  taller than the F25 X3 it is based on.

A total of $900 million was invested in the BMW Spartanburg plant in preparation for the production of X models, including the F26 X4.

Equipment 
Models are offered in a standard, xLine, or M Sport trim. All feature BMW EfficientDynamics program that includes an engine start stop system and brake energy regeneration. Available equipment includes 40:20:40 split folding rear seats, iDrive, a head-up display, and real-time traffic information. M40i models feature 19-inch alloy wheels, a sports exhaust system, a stiffer suspension setup, and M Sport styling.

All models are only available with all-wheel drive (xDrive), and meet Euro 6 emission regulations.

M Performance Parts were released in the facelift and can be installed to all models. These include carbon fibre mirrors, a sport steering wheel, M rims, black kidney grilles, a carbon fibre spoiler and Aluminium pedals. 30d models also get a power boost kit making 27hp more (286hp) and 20d models can be fitted with a dual exhaust.

Models

Petrol engines

Diesel engines

Second generation (G02; 2018) 

The second-generation was revealed online in February 2018 as the successor to the F26 X4, with sales commenced in July 2018. It shares its platform and basic styling elements with the third-generation BMW X3. Available variants include xDrive30i, xDrive20d, xDrive30d, xDriveM40i, and xDriveM40d.

In North America, the 2019 BMW X4 went on sale in the second quarter of 2018 as an early 2019 model year vehicle. It is available in either xDrive30i or M40i variants.

Development and launch 
The G02 X4 was developed alongside the G01 X3, on which it is based on. The X4 features dual ball joint front axle and five-link rear axle suspension, and uses BMW's Cluster Architecture (CLAR) platform that incorporates aluminium and high strength steel. Compared to its predecessor, the X4 is  lighter and is  taller,  longer, and  wider.

Equipment 
Standard equipment consists of bi-LED headlights, an automatic tailgate, 40:20:40 split folding rear seats, and iDrive 6.0. Models are offered in xLine, M Sport, and M Sport X trim. xLine trim models feature underbody protection, 19-inch alloy wheels and sports seats, while M Sport models include M Sport styling, and M Sport suspension and brakes. M Sport X models include the same features, as well as anthracite headliner and Frozen Grey exterior trim elements. The M40i and M40d also gain a rear M Sport Differential—a single-clutch electromechanical rear differential which emulates the behavior of a conventional LSD. Optional ConnectedDrive features also enable Apple CarPlay and Amazon Alexa or Google Assistant integration.

All 20-40 models can be fitted with M Performance Parts. These include carbon fibre mirrors.

Full M models can be fitted with full M specific M Performance Parts. These include a splitter, spoiler, sport steering wheel, carbon fibre vents and kidney grilles.

Models

Petrol engines

Diesel engines

Alpina XD4 

The Alpina XD4 debuted at the 2018 Geneva Motor Show. It is available in left-hand drive markets only.

Production and sales

References

External links 

 Official website

X4
Cars introduced in 2014
2020s cars
Compact sport utility vehicles
Luxury crossover sport utility vehicles
All-wheel-drive vehicles